José Aguilar Pulsar (19 December 1958 – 4 April 2014) was a Cuban boxer. He won the Light Welterweight bronze medal at the 1980 Summer Olympics. He died in Guantánamo on 4 April 2014 from a cerebral infarction.

1980 Olympic results
Round of 32: Defeated Martin Brerton (Ireland) by TKO 1
Round of 16: Defeated Ryu Bun-Hwa (North Korea) by decision, 4-1
Quarterfinal: Defeated Farouk Jawad (Iraq) by TKO 3
Semifinal: Lost to Serik Konakbayev (USSR) by decision, 1-4 (was awarded bronze medal)

References

External links
sports-reference

1958 births
2014 deaths
Boxers at the 1980 Summer Olympics
Olympic boxers of Cuba
Olympic bronze medalists for Cuba
Olympic medalists in boxing
Cuban male boxers
Light-welterweight boxers
Medalists at the 1980 Summer Olympics
Boxers at the 1979 Pan American Games
Boxers at the 1983 Pan American Games
Pan American Games medalists in boxing
Pan American Games silver medalists for Cuba
Pan American Games bronze medalists for Cuba
Medalists at the 1979 Pan American Games
Medalists at the 1983 Pan American Games
20th-century Cuban people